At the 1952 Winter Olympics, three figure skating events were contested. Compulsory figures were skated at the outdoor Jordal Amfi rink, while the free skating portions of the competition were held at the huge Bislett Stadium, on a regulation-sized ice surface set inside the speed skating track. The competition opened with the ladies' figures on 16 and 17 February, followed by the men's figures on 19 February and then the three free skating events for ladies, men, and pairs. Somewhat unusually for competitions of this era, there were no particular problems with bad weather or poor ice conditions at the outdoor rinks. At this competition, Dick Button won his second Olympic title, and also became the first skater to land a triple jump—a triple loop jump—in competition.

Medalists

References

External links
Official Olympic Report
results

 
1952 Winter Olympics events
1952
1952 in figure skating
International figure skating competitions hosted by Norway